Margaret Moir  (born 9 September 1941) is a former New Zealand politician of the National Party. Previously, she was the elected chairman of the West Coast Regional Council.

Biography

Moir was born in Kimberley, South Africa, and was a businesswoman in Hokitika with her husband.

She represented the West Coast electorate in Parliament from 1990 to 1993, when she was defeated by Damien O'Connor. She is one of six one-term National MPs who were elected in a swing against Labour in the 1990 election. She was unsuccessful as a list candidate in the 1996 election. After leaving Parliament Moir served as a director of two state-owned enterprises: Timberlands West Coast Limited and MetService.

In 1993, Moir was awarded the New Zealand Suffrage Centennial Medal. In the 1995 Queen's Birthday Honours, she was appointed a Companion of the Queen's Service Order for public services.

Moir and her husband Derek now live in Akaroa. She was treasurer at Amy Adams' electorate office.

References

 1990 Parliamentary Candidates for the New Zealand National Party by John Stringer (New Zealand National Party, 1990)

1941 births
Living people
New Zealand National Party MPs
South African emigrants to New Zealand
Women members of the New Zealand House of Representatives
Companions of the Queen's Service Order
New Zealand MPs for South Island electorates
People from Kimberley, Northern Cape
People from Akaroa
People from Hokitika
Unsuccessful candidates in the 1996 New Zealand general election
Members of the New Zealand House of Representatives
Unsuccessful candidates in the 1993 New Zealand general election
Recipients of the New Zealand Suffrage Centennial Medal 1993
New Zealand justices of the peace